Josh Klausner is an American screenwriter.

He wrote Date Night (2010) and Shrek Forever After (2010).

Biography

Early life
Josh Klausner graduated from Princeton University in Princeton, New Jersey.

Career
He started his career in the movie industry as an assistant for Dumb & Dumber in 1994. He then worked as the second unit director for Kingpin in 1996, There’s Something About Mary in 1998, Me, Myself & Irene in 2000, and Shallow Hal in 2001.

He was the screenwriter of The 4th Floor (1999), Date Night (2010), and Shrek Forever After (2010).

Personal life
He is married to Hyatt Bass, a novelist and Texas oil heiress. They have two sons, Jasper and Hayden. They reside in a 12,000 square-foot house on Greenwich Street in the West Village on the island of Manhattan, in New York City.  The house, a former film studio, was redesigned by architect Annabelle Selldorf for them.

Filmography

References

External links

American male screenwriters
Living people
People from Greenwich Village
Princeton University alumni
Screenwriters from New York (state)
Year of birth missing (living people)